Gustav Lexau was a German swimmer and water polo player. He competed in the men's tournament at the 1900 Summer Olympics, and he was part of the German team that won the gold medal in the men's 200 metre team swimming event.

References

External links
 

Year of birth missing
Year of death missing
German male water polo players
Olympic water polo players of Germany
Water polo players at the 1900 Summer Olympics
Place of birth missing
Swimmers at the 1900 Summer Olympics
Medalists at the 1900 Summer Olympics
German male freestyle swimmers
Olympic swimmers of Germany
Olympic gold medalists for Germany
Olympic gold medalists in swimming